Max Gissen (1909 – November 14, 1984) was an American journalist known for book reviews at the magazine Time.

Background
Max Gissen was born in Kyiv, then the Russian Empire (today, Ukraine) and came with his family to the United States.  He grew up in Brattleboro, Vermont.  He attended Clark University.

Career
Gissen reviewed books in the magazine The New Republic under Edmund Wilson. During World War II, he served in the US Army as an infantry captain in Europe. In 1946, he joined Time, where he interacted with Whittaker Chambers, T.S. Matthews, and publisher and co-founder Henry Luce.  Initially, he wrote the Press section; in 1947, he took over book reviews.  He also started the Time Reading Program, a book series. While at Time, he wrote cover stories on Louis Armstrong and John P. Marquand, for the latter of which won public praise from publisher Henry Luce. Gissen retired in 1967.

Personal life and death
Gissen married Louise; they had a son and daughter. Gissen died age 75 on November 14, 1984, at his home in Weston, Connecticut.

Awards
 1 Silver Star
 4 Bronze Stars
 5 Battle Stars

References

1909 births
1985 deaths
Clark University alumni
American male journalists
20th-century American journalists
American literary critics
United States Army personnel of World War II
People from Brattleboro, Vermont
20th-century American male writers
20th-century American non-fiction writers
20th-century American educators
Time (magazine) people
United States Army officers
Emigrants from the Russian Empire to the United States